North Britain is a term which has been occasionally used, particularly in the 17th and 18th centuries, for either the northern part of Great Britain or Scotland, which occupies the northernmost third of the island. "North Britains" could also refer to Britons from Scotland; with North Briton later the standard spelling. Its counterparts were South Britain, generally used to refer to England and Wales and West Britain, usually referring to Ireland.

Origin
Early uses of the designation have been noted after the 1603 Union of the Crowns of the Kingdoms of England and Scotland.  In early use the term could refer to inhabitants of Scotland as well as the country itself; since at least the late 15th century, "Britain" could be equivalent to "Briton", even being used interchangeably in early texts. Accordingly, "North Britain" was sometimes used as equivalent to "North Briton". Francis Bacon wrote in 1604 that the union made "The people to be the South-Brittains and North-Brittains". The Oxford English Dictionary cites the poet Richard Brathwait, the play Wit at Several Weapons, and Sir William Mure of Rowallan as early 17th-century appearances of the name for Scotland as a whole. 

King James VI and I, the first joint monarch of both kingdoms, used the terms "South Britain" and "North Britain" for England and Scotland respectively, most famously in his Proclamation of 1606 (here) establishing the first Union Flag, where Scotland and England are not otherwise named:

This usage was repeated in Charles I's Proclamation of 1634 on the use of the flag, though adding England and Scotland too for explanation:

After the Acts of Union 1707, Scotland was sometimes referred to as "North Britain" officially. In 1707, the Royal Scots Greys were renamed the "Royal North British Dragoons". Similarly, the "Scots" in the name of the Royal Scots Fusiliers was changed to "North British", a name which lasted until 1877, when it became the "21st (Royal Scots Fusiliers) Regiment of Foot". In 1712, The Boston News-Letter in British North America was using the term "North British". The Oxford English Dictionary cites Matthew Prior using the spelling "North Briton" in 1718.
In Rob Roy (1817), Sir Walter Scott refers to a Scottish person in England as a North Briton, sometimes in the mouth of an English character but also in the authorial voice.

Historic use
"North Britain" is often used historically, referencing the period before the formation of Scotland and England. As such, it forms a geographic, yet politically and culturally neutral description of the area.

The term, particularly in adjective form, found use in the creation of the railway system. The North British Railway operated from 1846 to 1923, leaving a later legacy in the name of the North British Hotel in Edinburgh, which was renamed The Balmoral Hotel in the 1990s. The North British Locomotive Company existed from 1903 until its bankruptcy in 1962, again leaving a naming legacy in other organisations. 

The name is found in other private enterprises, examples being the Edinburgh North British Insurance Company, founded in 1809, and North British Distillery Company founded there in 1885. The North British Rubber Company was founded in 1856 in Edinburgh's Fountainbridge, notable for its Wellington boots and eventually becoming Hunter Boot Ltd.

An example of its use in respect to northern Great Britain rather than Scotland can be found in the title of the North British Academy of Arts which existed from 1908 to 1924 in Newcastle-upon-Tyne, a city in northern England.

The North Briton and New North Briton were newspapers in the 18th and 19th centuries, and in 1844 there was also a North British Advertiser. The North British Review was founded in 1844 by members of the Free Church of Scotland as a Scottish "national review" for those unsatisfied with the secular Edinburgh Review or the conservative Quarterly Review. It continued until 1871. In 1847 a North British Daily Mail was founded, which was renamed the Glasgow Daily Mail in 1901 and merged with the Glasgow Record the same year, ultimately becoming the Daily Record. Cousin Henry, one of Anthony Trollope's 1879 novels, was serialized in that year in the North British Weekly Mail. 

Particularly in the 19th century, "North Britain" or "N.B." was widely used for postal addresses in Scotland. However, by the early 20th century, any vestiges of popular usage of this style had declined. "South Britain", the complementary style apportioned to England, had never seriously established itself, either north or south of the Anglo-Scottish border.

At least two ships were named the SS North Britain: a 1940 vessel torpedoed in 1943, and the 1945 SS North Britain, which was built by Lithgows, Port Glasgow as the Empire Cyprus for the Ministry of War Transport. She was sold into merchant service in 1948 and renamed North Britain. In 1962, she was sold to Hong Kong and renamed Jesselton Bay, scrapped in 1968.

21st-century use
In current usage, the northern parts of Great Britain are sometimes referred to simply as 'the North', though this term is more frequently used to describe northern England. This usage is often prevalent in social commentary on the suggested "North–South divide".

In 2008 the universities of Aberdeen and Edinburgh, in addition to Heriot-Watt University, organised a North Britain Student Forum on geoscience and engineering topics.

See also
 The North Briton
 West Brit
 South Briton
 Scottish cultural cringe
 North–South divide in the United Kingdom

References

History of the British Isles
Regions of the United Kingdom
History of Great Britain
17th century in Scotland
18th century in Scotland